In List A cricket, Western Australia have played 299 matches, winning 168, losing 124, tying one and having nine matches either abandoned or ending in no result. Western Australia played its first List A match against South Australia in the quarter-final of 1969–70 Vehicle & General Australasian Knockout Cup. In total, 166 players have represented Western Australia. The team has played most of its matches in the Australian domestic limited-overs competition, but has also played matches against touring international sides. Western Australia is the most successful team in Australia domestic one-day history, having won the tournament 12 times and finished runners-up ten times since the tournament's inception. Western Australia also won the 2000–01 Champions Cup.

List of players
Statistics are only for matches played for Western Australia
Players currently holding a state contract are marked with an asterisk (*)
Players who have played international cricket are highlighted in   blue
Statistics are correct as of the 2017–18 JLT One-Day Cup season:

See also
List of Western Australia first-class cricketers
List of Western Australia Twenty20 cricketers
List of Western Australia cricket captains

References

Western Australia, List A

Western Australia, List A